Rogassa is a district in El Bayadh Province, Algeria. It was named after its capital, Rogassa.

Municipalities
The district is further divided into 3 municipalities:
Rogassa
Kef Lahmar
Cheguig

Districts of El Bayadh Province